The Duan goat breed from Guangxi Province in China is used for the production of meat.  It has a black, white, or pied coat coloration.

References

Sources
 

Meat goat breeds
Goat breeds originating in China
Goat breeds